Michael Healy-Rae (born 9 January 1967) is an Irish Independent politician who has been a Teachta Dála (TD) for the Kerry constituency since 2016, and previously from 2011 to 2016 for the Kerry South constituency. He previously served as Chair of the Committee on European Union Affairs from 2016 to 2020.

Prior to entering national politics, he was involved in local politics in County Kerry and pursued business interests.

Family life
He is the youngest son of Jackie Healy-Rae, who was a TD for Kerry South from 1997 to 2011, and a brother of Danny Healy-Rae who is also a TD. His mother, Julie Healy, was born in Wilmington, Delaware, U.S., but grew up in New York City, New York. He has 5 children, two of whom were found guilty and convicted of assault charges in 2019. His son, Jackie Healy-Rae Jnr, was elected as a councillor for Castleisland LEA at the 2019 Kerry County Council election.

Local politics
Healy-Rae is a former member of Kerry County Council, and was first elected to the Council at the 1999 local elections, representing the Killorglin local electoral area. He retained his seat with an increased vote at the 2004 local elections.

Reality television
In autumn 2007, Michael Healy-Rae took part in a reality television show on RTÉ called Celebrities Go Wild, set in the "unforgiving landscapes" of Connemara, County Galway. He emerged as the winner, having received the largest number of votes from the "viewing public". In June 2011, news broke of a voting scandal, for which journalist Senan Molony received the award for "Scoop of the Year" at the National Newspapers of Ireland's Journalism Awards. It was revealed that Healy-Rae had received 3,636 votes, from a phone in Leinster House, at a cost of €2,600 to the Irish taxpayer, the premium-rate calls being charged on a tariff designed to raise money for charity. Only limited information was available as to how the calls were made. Speculation that an automated dialler had been employed was discounted by the Irish Independent, which suggested they were made over 31 hours using "redial". The Ceann Comhairle Seán Barrett, described it as "an outrageous abuse of facilities", while the Taoiseach Enda Kenny, said the money spent on the calls should be paid back. On 29 June 2011, Healy-Rae said that while he was not involved in the calls, he would pay the money back.

In October 2017, Healy-Rae appeared on Livin' with Lucy.

National politics
Healy-Rae was elected for the Kerry South constituency at the 2011 general election, when his father Jackie retired from national politics. He, like fellow Independents Michael Lowry and Noel Grealish, were not members of the Technical group in the 31st Dáil. He missed two-thirds of votes in his first Dáil term, despite being signed in for his expenses on each day a vote was taken.

Healy-Rae was appointed to the board of the Citizens' Information Board in April 2009. He was asked twice to resign his position from the board because of a conflict of interest between his subsequent membership of the Dáil and his membership of a body advising the Minister for Social Protection. After he refused to resign, the Minister dismissed him in July 2011.

On 9 December 2011, having earlier participated in a debate on social welfare, he took ill at Leinster House and was advised to leave the Dáil chamber. Health minister James Reilly, a medical doctor, tended to him outside the chamber, he was brought from Leinster House on a stretcher, placed in an ambulance and rushed to St. James's Hospital.

His political platform includes opposition to tighter controls on drinking and driving. His father and brother have also expressed similar views on such legislation. In January 2012, Healy-Rae proposed changing Ireland's number plate system so that the supposedly unlucky number 13 would be dropped for the year 2013 to save the Irish car industry.

Healy-Rae has raised The Hum in Dáil Éireann after witnessing it himself while meeting some of his constituents who were "nearly gone out of their minds" with it. The official response he received, was described by Healy-Rae as "away with the fairies gobbledygook."

He topped the poll in Kerry at the 2016 general election; his brother Danny was elected alongside him. This was the first time that two siblings from the same constituency were elected to the Dáil. A short while later, on the evening of 20 March 2016, Michael Healy-Rae experienced being unintentionally "tossed around by a cow" who was after calving in a shed at his farm near Kilgarvan. He was taken to hospital with his injuries.

At the general election in February 2020, he topped the poll again, and was re-elected on the first count.

Property Development
In February 2018, Michael Healy-Rae listed 11 properties for letting or rental and two either being renovated or awaiting planning permission in the register of TDs' interests.

In March 2020, it was reported that he had added three properties to his portfolio in the 2019 Register of TD's interests, bringing the number of properties to 21. The three new properties include a house in Clonkeen for which purchase was going through contract stage, a house in Tralee at the same stage and a property in Kilgarvan that is in the process of being renovated.

In May 2020, he was refused planning permission to convert the ground floor of Nancy Myles Pub in the Ballymullen area of Tralee. The plan was for four apartments and had met with strong local opposition. The council's decision was appealed by a number of locals and a conservation organisation. The majority of the decision to refuse was based on the grounds that the proposal would not allow the residents enough natural light or amenity standards. It was the second time the appeals board has overturned a decision by Kerry County Council to grant him a change of use for the pub.

In February 2021 the Register of Members Interests was published, covering 2020, revealing that he remained the largest landlord in the Dáil, with 5 plots of land, 16 properties. A quarter of TDs are landlords or property investors.

Other interests
He has also listed in the register of TDs interests that he is a postmaster, farmer, plant hire business operator and shop owner. His plant-hire business has worked for the Health Service Executive and he has a contract for providing fuel to Kerry County Council.

In May 2020, a complaint was lodged with the clerk of the Dáil over his failure to declare his interest in The Skellig Hotel Experience, a company that ran the Skellig Star Hotel in Cahersiveen. He had a 25% share in the company after investing €25,000 in January 2019, but there was no entry for his shareholding on the Oireachtas Register of Interests. Oireachtas members are required to declare any shareholding over €13,000. When controversy over the leasing of the hotel Michael Healy-Rae said that he was not involved in the leasing of the hotel, but he later accepted the Skellig Hotel Experience held the lease.

The company was sold in December 2019 to Paul Collins who runs Direct Provision centres. Michael Healy-Rae was adamant that he had no knowledge that it would be converted into a Direct Provision centre.

Other
In December 2019, he was transferred to hospital after a fire at his shop.

In May 2020, he called for the Leaving Certificate exams in 2020 to be cancelled due to COVID-19, in contrast to his brother Danny who said that the exams should go ahead in 2020 with proper social distancing, possibly using public buildings such as community centres and libraries.

Publications
 Time to Talk: Stories from the Heart of Ireland, Gill, Ireland 2018.
 A Listening Ear: More Stories from the Heart of Ireland, Gill, Ireland 2019.

References

1967 births
Living people
Michael
Independent TDs
Irish people of American descent
Local councillors in County Kerry
Members of the 31st Dáil
Members of the 32nd Dáil
Members of the 33rd Dáil
Participants in Irish reality television series
Politicians from County Kerry